Nguyễn Huỳnh Kim Duyên (born 19 October 1995) is a Vietnamese beauty queen and model. She placed 1st Runner-up at Miss Universe Vietnam 2019 and was later appointed Miss Universe Vietnam 2021 to compete at Miss Universe 2021 in Israel, where she placed in the top 16. On February 22, 2022, she was appointed to represent Vietnam at Miss Supranational 2022. During the coronation night, she finished as the 2nd Runner-up. This is the highest achievement for Vietnam at Miss Supranational, breaking the record of Daniela Nguyễn Thu Mây at Miss Supranational 2011, who placed 3rd Runner-up.

Early life and education
Kim Duyên was born and raised in Can Tho in a purely agricultural family.  She dropped out of university.

Pageantry
Kim Duyên's first beauty pageant was Miss Aodai Vietnam (or Miss World Vietnam 2014) where she placed in Top 12. Two years later, she won the crown of Miss Elegance Student at Southern Can Tho University in 2016 while placing in Top 30 contestants competing in coronation night of Miss Vietnam 2016. Her return to pageantry paid off when she won the 1st runner-up title of Miss Universe Vietnam 2019 at the Crown Convention Center in Nha Trang, Vietnam. By placing in Top 2 with Nguyễn Trần Khánh Vân, who represented Vietnam at Miss Universe 2020, Kim Duyên became Miss Universe Vietnam 2021 and represented Vietnam at Miss Universe 2021 in Eilat, Israel. After returning from Miss Universe 2021 as one of 16 semifinalists, Kim Duyên was appointed to become Miss Supranational Vietnam 2022 on February 22, 2022.

Miss Universe 2021
The 70th Miss Universe competition was  held in Eilat, Israel on December 13, 2021. The former Miss Universe 2020 Andrea Meza crowned her successor Harnaaz Sandhu from India after 7 months of reign due to the 69th edition being interrupted by the COVID-19 pandemic. Kim Duyên finished at top 16 semifinalists and won the popular vote from the viewers.

Kim Duyen's biography on the Miss Universe official website is described as follows:

Miss Supranational 2022
Kim Duyên represented Vietnam and joined other national representatives from around the world at Miss Supranational 2022. She placed 2nd Runner-Up,  the highest placing for Vietnam since the country entered the pageant. In one of the pageant’s challenge events, Kim managed to win the Miss Supra Chat special award, together with Adinda Cresheilla of Indonesia. Lalela Mswane of South Africa was crowned by Chanique Rabe of Namibia at the end.

References

Miss Universe 2021 contestants
Living people
1995 births
People from Cần Thơ
Vietnamese beauty pageant winners
Vietnamese female models
21st-century Vietnamese women